The Harvard Crimson men's lacrosse team represents Harvard University in National Collegiate Athletic Association (NCAA) Division I men's lacrosse. Harvard competes as a member of the Ivy League and plays its home games at Cumnock Turf and Harvard Stadium in Cambridge, Massachusetts.

History
Harvard fielded its first lacrosse team in 1878, and the following year, joined the United States National Amateur Lacrosse Association alongside New York University and nine club teams. In 1881, Harvard defeated Princeton to win the first intercollegiate lacrosse tournament. In 1882, the Intercollegiate Lacrosse Association was formed, and the following season also inducted the newly established Yale lacrosse team. Harvard and Princeton dominated the league throughout the 1880s, and the Crimson claimed the title in 1882, 1885, 1886, and 1887. The United States Intercollegiate Lacrosse League (USILL) was formed in 1905, divided into a Northern Division and Southern Division. Championships were awarded in each division based on record and strength of schedule. Harvard was named the Northern Division champions six consecutive seasons from 1908 to 1913, and again in 1915.

In 1941, Navy refused to play the integrated Harvard team, so its athletic director ordered home its one black player rather than forfeit the game. The Crimson secured the Ivy League championship with the best league record in 1964*, 1980*, 1990* and 2014* (* denotes title shared with at least one other team). In 1971, the NCAA established the national championship tournament. Harvard made its first appearance in 1980, when it lost in the first round to Johns Hopkins, 16–12. The Crimson returned to the event in 1988 and were edged, 10–9, by Navy in the opening round. In 1990, Harvard won its first NCAA tournament game when it defeated Notre Dame, 9–3. In the quarterfinals, the Crimson were beaten handily, 18–3, by North Carolina. Harvard returned to the quarterfinals in 1996, after beating Hofstra, 15–12, and then fell to eventual national runners-up Virginia, 23–12. It was a decade before the Crimson again reached the tournament. They were beaten in the 2006 first round by Syracuse, 11–4.

Head coaches

 Unknown (1881–1902)
 McConaghy (1903)
 Unknown (1904–1909)
 E. A. Menary (1910)
 Unknown (1911–1916)
 No team (1917–1918)
 Michael H. Cochrane (1919)
 Paul Gustafson (1920–1923)
 Unknown (1924)
 Irving Lydecker (1925–1926)
 Talbot Hunter (1927)
 Talbot Hunter & H. W. Jeffers (1928)
 Madison Sayles and E. F. Gamache (1929)
 Madison Sayles (1930–1932)
 Robert Poole (1933–1935)
 Neil Stahley (1936–1939)
 John Witherspoon (1940–1941)
 Benjamin R. Martin (1942–1943)
 No team (1944–1946)
 Robert Maddux (1947–1948)
 J. Bruce Munro (1949–1974)
 Bob Scalise (1975–1987)
 Scott Anderson (1988–2007)
 John Tillman (2008–2010)
 Chris Wojcik (2011–19)
 Gerry Byrne (2019-present)

Season results
The following is a list of Harvard's results by season as an NCAA Division I program:

{| class="wikitable"

|- align="center"

}}

{{CBB Yearly Record Subtotal
 | name       = Gerry Byrne
 | overall    = 13–9 
 | confrecord = 4–3 

†NCAA canceled 2020 collegiate activities due to the COVID-19 virus.

References

External links
 

 
Lacrosse teams in Massachusetts